Thurnen may refer to:

Kirchenthurnen, known as Thurnen until 1860, a village in the canton of Bern, Switzerland
Thürnen, a municipality in the canton of Baselland, Switzerland
Thurnen, Bern, a municipality in Switzerland